Razin (also Romanized as Razīn; also known as Rāzīān and Rūzīn) is a village in Poshtdarband Rural District, in the Central District of Kermanshah County, Kermanshah Province, Iran. At the 2006 census, its population was 973, in 232 families.

References 

Populated places in Kermanshah County